Lawrence E. Elkins High School, more commonly known as Elkins High School is a comprehensive public high school in Missouri City, Texas, that serves communities in Sugar Land and Missouri City. The school, which handles grades 9 through 12, is a part of the Fort Bend Independent School District. Elkins was established in 1992, with its first graduating class in 1995.

Elkins received a Blue Ribbon Award from the United States Department of Education in 2002. In addition, Elkins high school was ranked 715th among the top 1000 schools in the United States by Newsweek in 2005.  The Washington Post also ranked Elkins High School among the Top High Schools in the Nation in 2011.

History
Lawrence E. Elkins High School was established as a grade 9 and 10 school in the Fall of 1992  to alleviate overcrowding from three other district high schools, Dulles, Clements, and Willowridge. Elkins was FBISD's fifth comprehensive high school.

Neighborhoods served

Areas served by the school include Quail Valley, Meadow Creek, Lake Olympia, and all of Riverstone.

It formerly served Arcola, Fresno, Juliff, and parts of the area near Rosharon in Fort Bend County.

Academies
The Engineering Academy informs and encourage students to  learn about the potential of a career in engineering. Courses include Engineering Principles & Systems and Engineering Computer Applications. Advanced Engineering Internship is also offered in which students are able to work alongside professional engineers.

In Internship, students will work with NASA and other programs dedicated to the engineering arts and studies. Elective classes include the classical courses in Electrical and Mechanical Engineering, emerging courses also include those in the area of Domestic Engineering and Waste Management.

Mix It Up Day
On November 16, 2004, the principal of Elkins High School allowed the school to participate in the nationwide Mix It Up Day.

Academic competition

Academic decathlon
3rd place regional 2006
21st place state 2008
16th place state 2011
2nd place region 2017
12th place state 2017
1st place individual student score of Houston-area medium schools 2017
Academic octathlon
Math and science club (UIL and TMSCA)
School merit roll, AMC 12 A&B
2004, 2005, 2006, 2009
8th place TMSCA state 2003
5th place TMSCA state 2004
6th place TMSCA state 2008
4th place TMSCA state 2009
5th place TMSCA state 2010
1st place TMSCA state 2022
Speech and debate (TFA and NFL)
5th place state 2007
1st place duet interpretation state 2007, Lindsley Howard and Darry Hearon
6th place duet interpretation state 2007
3rd place duo interpretation state 2007, Sami Atassi and Shannon Kitner
4th place LD state 2008, Andrew Cockroft
Top 8 LD Tournament of Champions (TOC) 2008, Andrew Cockroft
UIL academics
1st place conference 5A state academic champions, 1994–95
1st place conference 5A state academic champions, 1995–96
Calculator applications
2nd place state 1995
3rd place state 1995
1st place state 1996
6th place state 1996
1st place state 2001
3rd place state 2001
6th place state 2002
1st place state 2004
2nd place state 2022
Mathematics
1st place state 1996
5th place state 2004
Number sense
3rd place state 1995
4th place state 1995
1st place state 1996
5th place state 1996
6th place state 2001
Science
5th place 1994
2nd place 1995
1st place 1996
Computer applications
4th place state 2002
Constitutional law
1st place state 2005, 2008, 2011
AFJROTC
3rd place armed drill team regulation fort bend drill comp 2009
 1st place male color guard fort bend drill comp 2009
 1st place altitude rocketry meet 2005 (Major Richard Mayfield)
 1st place drift rocketry meet 2005 (Major Richard Mayfield)

Fine arts
Art
Band
In 2005, Lawrence E. Elkins HS had the most students in TMEA All-State of any school in Texas.
In 2009, the Elkins HS Honors Band was one of 18 bands selected in the USA to attend and perform at the BOA Music For All National Concert Festival in Indianapolis.
In 2015, Elkins Knights placed fifth at the area sweepstakes in Waller, Texas.
In 2016, the Elkins HS Honors Band advanced to the state honor band finals and placed as the twelfth ranked band in the state of Texas.
State marching season
Drumline
Marching season
Indoor drumline: Won 1st place at the TCGC state indoor finals in 2001, 2003, 2004, 2006, 2007, 2008 and 2nd place in 2002, 2005, 2012
Knightbeats
Knightingales
Schola cantori
Bell canto
End effect
Camerata
Elite dance team
Drama (theatre)
Orchestra

Honor societies
English Honor Society
International Thespian Society
Mu Alpha Theta
National Art Honor Society
National Forensic League
National French Honor Society
National Honor Society
Science National Honor Society – This national organization was founded by an Elkins student.
Spanish Honor Society
Kitty Hawk Honor Society (ROTC)

Athletics

Clements / Elkins rivalry

In 1992, after Elkins was built to alleviate overcrowding from William P. Clements High School, zoning issues forced many families in different subdivisions around the city of Sugar Land to send their children to both high schools. Still today, it is not uncommon to find next door neighbors or siblings going to opposing schools as feeder middle schools and zoning patterns overlap.

In 1996, after an outbreak of senior pranks between the two schools, the principals of both high schools decided to focus the rivalry in a less destructive manner. After meeting with both schools' Student Councils, the principals decided to hold an annual, year-long competition.

Each school's athletic program can earn points based on wins against the other school in UIL competition. The competitions include: boys' football, basketball, baseball, and soccer, and girls' volleyball, basketball, softball, and soccer. A school earns one point when it defeats the rival school. A game ending in a tie score will award both teams one-half point. As often occurs, the schools sometimes meet more than once per year. In the event of a tie for the overall competition, the school's band that is ranked the highest at the Texas UIL regional marching band competition will be the year's winner.

Since 1997, the schools have held the competition every year. As both schools' mascots (the Ranger and the Knight) typically ride horses, the "Golden Horse" trophy is awarded and displayed in the champion school's trophy case at the beginning of each new school year.

Notable alumni

Cornelius Anthony – San Francisco 49ers football player (class of 1996)
Pat Batteaux – NFL player (class of 1996)
Ross Blacklock (class of 2016) – NFL defensive end for the Houston Texans
KaRon Coleman – gridiron football player (class of 1996)
Matt Carpenter – MLB player with the New York Yankees (class of 2004)
Keli Goff – Journalist, tv writer and Emmy nominated producer 
D.J. Hayden – NFL cornerback for Oakland Raiders, Detroit Lions (class of 2008)
Chad Huffman – MLB and NPB outfielder 
Maxo Kream - rapper  
James Loney – MLB first baseman for Los Angeles Dodgers, Tampa Bay Rays (class of 2002) 
Jake Matthews – former Texas A&M University offensive lineman and current Atlanta Falcons tackle (class of 2010)
Kevin Matthews – former Texas A&M football player and NFL offensive lineman (class of 2005) 
Jamal Marshall – football player, North Texas and Seattle Seahawks cornerback (class of 2012)
J'Mon Moore - NFL player
Kenneth Murray- former Oklahoma football player and current NFL Linebacker for the Los Angeles Chargers (class of 2017) 
Kendrick Sampson – actor who has been on television shows such as How To Get Away with Murder and The Vampire Diaries''
Travis Scott – rapper, singer, and record producer
Crystle Stewart – Miss USA 2008
Corey Thompson - NFL player
Kip Wells former American professional baseball pitcher (class of 1995)
R'Bonney Gabriel - Miss USA 2022

Notoriety

Cyber-bullying
Girls from Elkins and the other Fort Bend High Schools of Dulles and Clements, were cyber-bullied in April 2010 on a Facebook page titled Whimsical Girls of FBISD. The page listed several female students on each school's "naughty" list. Police and the school district were unable to determine who was responsible for the page, but Facebook took the page down at the district's request.

Blackface incident 
In late 2016, controversy erupted after a photo emerged of a white Elkins High School student in blackface. The photo appeared on Snapchat before spreading rapidly, eventually arriving on Twitter. The student, alleged to be a sophomore at the time of the incident, privated her Twitter account before deleting it outright.

2020 Firearm incident 
On October 2, 2020, a 15-year-old student at Elkins was arrested for allegedly bringing a firearm to a junior varsity football game against Marshall High School. Principle Cindy Ward stated that an Elkins staff member swiftly isolated the individual and confiscated the weapon. Fort Bend ISD district police later took the student into custody without incident.

2021 School shooting threat 
Shortly after the 2021 Oxford High School shooting, a verbal threat was made at the school.

Feeder patterns
The following elementary schools feed into Elkins:
 Austin Parkway (partial)
 Commonwealth (partial)
 Lantern Lane
 Lexington Creek (partial)
 Palmer (partial)
 Quail Valley
 Settlers Way (partial)
 Anne Sullivan
The following middle schools feed into Elkins:
 Fort Settlement (partial)
 First Colony (partial)
 Lake Olympia (partial)
 Quail Valley

References

External links
Elkins Home Page
Elkins Baseball
Elkins Softball
Elkins Athletics
Elkins Math and Science Club
Elkins Official Website
Elkins Band

1992 establishments in Texas
Educational institutions established in 1992
Fort Bend Independent School District high schools
Missouri City, Texas